Toyota Active Control Suspension was (according to Toyota) the world's first fully active suspension.

It was a complex hydropneumatic, computer-controlled active suspension system. This did away with conventional springs and anti-roll (stabiliser) bars in favour of hydraulic struts controlled by an array of sensors (such as yaw velocity sensors, vertical G sensors, height sensors, wheel speed sensors, longitudinal and lateral G sensors) that detected cornering, acceleration and braking forces. The system worked well and gave an unusually controlled yet smooth ride with no body roll. However, the additional weight and power requirements of the system affected straight-line performance somewhat.

Introduced in September 1989 on the Japanese market only Toyota Celica ST183 GT-R Active Sports.

Ten years later, Mercedes-Benz introduced a very similar active suspension, called Active Body Control, on the Mercedes-Benz CL-Class in 1999.

Vehicles 
 Toyota Curren ST207 1994-1995 XS Touring Selection
 Toyota Celica ST183 1989–1993
 Toyota Soarer 1991–1996

See also 
 Active Body Control
 Toyota Electronic Modulated Suspension

References 

Toyota
Automotive suspension technologies
Automotive technology tradenames
Automotive safety technologies
Auto parts
Mechanical power control